John Anderson (31 May 1888 – 3 August 1957) was an Australian rules footballer who played with Essendon in the Victorian Football League (VFL).

Family
The son of John Anderson, and Jane Anderson, née Taylor, John Anderson was born at Essendon, Victoria on 31 May 1888.

Football
Recruited from Essendon Juniors, he played his first match for Essendon, against Geelong, on 27 April 1907.

Notes

References
 
 Maplestone, M., Flying Higher: History of the Essendon Football Club 1872–1996, Essendon Football Club, (Melbourne), 1996.

External links 

1888 births
Australian rules footballers from Melbourne
Essendon Football Club players
1957 deaths
People from Essendon, Victoria